Freedom Frog is a frog mascot character of Intervention Helpline, an Alaska counseling nonprofit organization. It is used in school animations and can be seen during Iditarod races.

Intervention Helpline
Intervention Helpline is an Alaska counseling nonprofit organization helping people to quit drugs and alcohol.

The organization uses Freedom Frog for scholar and other organization animations.

Acronym
It is proposed than free could mean Family Recovery Educates Everyone and frog Family Recovery Ongoing Growth.

Iditarod
During the ceremonial start of the Iditarod Trail Sled Dog Race in Anchorage, Freedom Frog could be seen on a sledge.

The following racers hosted Freedom Frog on their sledge:
 2008: Benedikt Beisch
 2009: Bill Cotter
 2010: Ross Adam

Book
A book, The adventures of freedom frog, explains to children the issues of addiction.

References

Iditarod
American mascots
Frog mascots
Fictional characters from Alaska